Popularne is a Polish brand of cigarettes, currently owned and manufactured by the State Tobacco Industry in Kraków. Consumers called them populares, killers or gwoździe (Polish for nails).

History
Until the beginning of the 1980s, Popularne was called Sport. Originally, the cigarettes did not have filters; Popularne with filters became available at the end of the 20th century. The content of tar and nicotine was higher Popularne than in modern manufactured cigarettes.

See also

 Tobacco smoking

References

Cigarette brands